CNPA may refer to:

 Counter Narcotics Police of Afghanistan
 Carolina Nature Photographers Association
 California Newspaper Publishers Association